Susan Michaelis is a former Australian flight instructor and airline transport (ATPL) pilot. She is also a researcher working on the issue of contaminated air on aircraft and the health effects of exposure to heated jet engine oils and hydraulic fluids known to contaminate the breathing air supply on aircraft, often called Aerotoxic Syndrome. She is a part of the University of Stirling’s Occupational and Environmental Health Research group where she is a Honorary Sensor Research Fellow.

Early life and education 
Michaelis was born in Melbourne, Australia, and attended Lauriston Girls' School. In 1986, she received her Bachelor of Business (Marketing) from the Chisholm Institute of Technology before moving on to train as an airline pilot.

Michaelis obtained a Ph.D. in Safety Science in 2010 from the University of New South Wales (UNSW). Her thesis addressed health and flight safety implications of exposure to aircraft contaminated air.

In 2016, she qualified as an air accident investigator and obtained an MSc at Cranfield University in ‘Air Safety and Accident Investigation’. Her thesis addressed how oil leaks past seals in turbine engines.

Dr. Michaelis also holds National Examination Board in Occupational Safety and Health (NEBOSH) and COSHH qualifications in health and safety and the use of hazardous substances.

In 1999, along with Ansett Australia Airlines flight attendant, Judy Cullinane, she helped initiate the 1999 Australian Senate Rural and Regional Affairs and Transport References Committee inquiry into contaminated air on aircraft.

Michaelis has completed two half Ironman triathlon events.

Career as a pilot 
Michaelis initially worked as a flight instructor at Southern Air Services at Moorabbin Airport in Melbourne before working in the Northern Territory flying single and multi-crew commercial flights across the top end of Australia for Air North and Lloyd Aviation on twin Cessna and Embraer EMB 110 Bandeirante aircraft.

In 1991, she joined Eastern Australia Airlines (became Qantaslink), and was the first officer on a British Aerospace Jetstream 31 flight from Sydney to Newcastle that later became the first all-female-crewed flight for the QANTAS Airways Group.

In 1994, she began flying the British Aerospace BAe 146 until 1997, when Dr. Michaelis retired due to ill health after repeated exposure to contaminated air on the aircraft she flew.

Career as a researcher 
In 2006, she was appointed Head of Research for the not-for-profit Global Cabin Air Quality Executive (GCAQE) and published in 2007, the ‘Aviation Contaminated Air Reference Manual’.

Dr. Michaelis sits on numerous committees dealing with the topic of contaminated air such as the European European Committee for Standardization (CEN) Committee TC436, SAE International SAE-E31, and AC-9 committees.

She is regularly asked to speak at international conferences on the topic of aircraft contaminated air, and has published many peer-reviewed papers.

She is also a member of the Institution of Occupational Safety and Health (IOSH) and the International Institute of Risk and Safety Management (IIRSM).

Dr. Michaelis is featured in three documentaries called, ‘Flying Sheilas’ (2007), ‘Angel without Wings’ (2010), and ‘Broken Wings’ (2011).

Awards 
In 1987, she was awarded the Civil Aviation Safety Authority Sir Donald Anderson Trophy for Academic Merit when she qualified as a commercial pilot.

In 2017, she was awarded the Cranfield University Course Director's Prize for her work on her MSc 'Implementation Of The Requirements For The Provision Of Clean Air In Crew And Passenger Compartments Using The Aircraft Bleed Air System.'

In 2018, she was awarded the Global Cabin Air Quality Executive annual ‘Flight Safety Award’.

In 2023, she was awarded a prestigious British Citizen Awards, the first Australian to receive the award. On announcing her award, a British Citizen Awards press release dated 9 January 2023 stated: 'Aged 34, Susan’s dream career as an airline pilot came to a devastating end as she became very ill and deemed no longer medically fit to fly. For the last 25 years, she has dedicated her life to getting the problem of contaminated air on aircraft recognised and fixed. She has achieved some impressive milestones, committing to protect crews and the travelling public. To make a change and achieve her goals, she retrained by doing both a PhD in Occupational Safety in the Workplace and then an MSc. She has successfully motivated air crew unions globally (including in the UK) and the Royal Australian Air Force to help her address this occupational health and flight safety issue, with unions representing over 200,000 members. In 2006, she played a vital role in unions creating the Global Cabin Air Quality Executive to fix the problem. Susan was appointed Head of Research, a job she has mostly done unpaid. Today, Susan has Stage four breast cancer, a cancer her doctors are convinced came from her exposure to engine oils at work 25 years ago. Due in part to her extensive work, the industry is now taking more steps towards resolving this important health issue.'

References 

Australian scientists
Living people
People educated at Lauriston Girls' School
Year of birth missing (living people)
University of New South Wales alumni